"Habibi Dah (Nari Narain)"  is a popular Hindi Arabic song by Egyptian singer Hisham Abbas, with parts of the song sung in Hindi by Indian singer Jayashri also featuring actress Riva Bubber. The single went platinum in Egypt and won the award for Best Video at the Egyptian Oscars.

References

2001 songs
Arabic-language songs
Macaronic songs